NRD could refer to:
 Nidaros Roller Derby, Norway
 Non-radiative dielectric, or non-radiating dielectric, as used in non-radiative dielectric waveguide
 Noranda (mining company), Toronto Stock Exchange symbol NRD
 Nordic Airways, ICAO airline code NRD
 Norderney Airfield, IATA airport code NRD
 North Road railway station, National Rail station code NRD
 Non-delivery report, Microsoft Exchange Server system message
 Neural Respiratory Drive